Shapoor Zadran (born 8 July 1987) is an Afghan cricketer. Zadran is a left-arm fast-medium bowler. Zadran currently plays for the Afghanistan national cricket team.

Domestic career
Zadran made his debut for Afghanistan against Chitral in the 2003/4 Inter-District Senior Tournament. His international debut for the side came against Oman in the 2004 ACC Trophy. Zadran also represented Afghanistan in the 2006 ACC Trophy, playing a single against Bahrain, in the final which Afghanistan lost by 3 wickets.

In 2007, he made his List-A debut for Badureliya Cricket Club in against Chilaw Marians Cricket Club in Sri Lanka, playing a single match for the club in the 2007/8 Premier Limited Overs Tournament.

In 2007 he made his Twenty20 debut for Afghanistan in the 2007 ACC Twenty20 Cup against Qatar, playing 3 matches in the tournament, including in the final against Oman which ended in a tie.

Zadran was part of the rapidly rising Afghan team that from 2008 to 2009 won the World Cricket League Division Five, Division Four and Division Three, thus promoting them to Division Two and allowing them to partake in the 2009 ICC World Cup Qualifier, where they gained ODI status.

In 2009, Zadran made his first-class debut for Afghanistan in the Intercontinental Cup against a Zimbabwe XI in which Afghanistan drew the match.

International career
Zadran made his One Day International debut against the Netherlands during Afghanistan's tour of the Netherlands in 2009, where he took 4/24 from 10 overs. Despite this, Afghanistan lost the match by 8 runs.

Later, in November 2009 he was a member of Afghanistan's 2009 ACC Twenty20 Cup winning squad. In 2010 made his full Twenty20 International debut against Ireland in the 2010 Quadrangular Twenty20 Series in Sri Lanka. Later on in February 2010, Zadran was a key member of Afghanistan's victorious 2010 ICC World Twenty20 Qualifier winning squad and was later named in Afghanistan's squad for the 2010 ICC World Twenty20.

In April 2010, Zadran was a key member of Afghanistan's 2010 ACC Trophy Elite winning squad which defeated Nepal in the final, with Zadran taking a single wicket for the cost of just 11 runs from 7 overs.

He was part of Afghanistan squad in the T20 World Cup 2012 in Sri Lanka and looked impressive. In the T20 World Cup, he along with Gulbadin Naib set the record for the highest 9th wicket partnership in ICC World T20 history (44), which is still a record for Afghanistan.

In August 2019, he was named in Afghanistan's Test squad for their one-off match against Bangladesh, but he did not play. In September 2021, he was named in Afghanistan's squad for the 2021 ICC Men's T20 World Cup.

References

External links

1987 births
Living people
Pashtun people
Afghan cricketers
Afghanistan One Day International cricketers
Afghanistan Twenty20 International cricketers
Badureliya Sports Club cricketers
Khulna Tigers cricketers
Asian Games medalists in cricket
Cricketers at the 2010 Asian Games
Cricketers at the 2015 Cricket World Cup
Asian Games silver medalists for Afghanistan
Medalists at the 2010 Asian Games